Hans Wiltschek (December 15, 1911 – December 19, 1999) was an Austrian boxer who competed in the 1936 Summer Olympics. In 1936 he was eliminated in the first round of the featherweight class after losing his fight to the upcoming silver medalist Charles Catterall.

External links
Hans Wiltschek's profile at Sports Reference.com

1911 births
1999 deaths
Featherweight boxers
Olympic boxers of Austria
Boxers at the 1936 Summer Olympics
Austrian male boxers
20th-century Austrian people